The Cape wolf snake (Lycophidion capense) is a species of oviparous, nonvenomous snake which occurs over a wide area of Southern, Central, and East Africa. Though docile and harmless, it may be confused with the very venomous stiletto snake.

Subspecies
The species contains three subspecies, including the nominotypical subspecies, L. c. capense:

Lycophidion capense capense 
Lycophidion capense jacksoni 
Lycophidion capense loveridgei 

Nota bene: A trinomial authority in parentheses indicates that the subspecies was originally described in a genus other than Lycophidion.

Description
Adults regularly reach 40 cm in length, but some grow to 64 cm. It has a flattened, tapering head and marbled eye. The brown or black lateral and dorsal scales are tipped white, while the ventral scales are all-white. Long recurved fangs are present on the upper as well as lower jaws, for which they are named.

Diet and behaviour
They are widely distributed but prefer damp locations, with lowland forest and fynbos being preferred habitats. They feed mostly on geckos and skinks which they bite and kill by constriction. They are believed to reach an age of 15 to 20 years.

References

Further reading

Boulenger GA. 1893. Catalogue of the Snakes in the British Museum (Natural History). Volume I., Containing the Families ... Colubridæ Aglyphæ, part. London: Trustees of the British Museum (Natural History). (Taylor and Francis, printers). xiii + 448 pp. + Plates I-XXVIII. (Lycophidium capense, pp. 339–340; Lycophidium jacksoni, new species, p. 340 + Plate XXI, figure 3).
Branch, Bill. 2004. Field Guide to Snakes and other Reptiles of Southern Africa. Third Revised edition, Second impression. Sanibel Island, Florida: Ralph Curtis Books. 399 pp. . (Lycophidion capense, p. 76 + Plate 36).
Smith A. 1831. "Contributions to the Natural History of South Africa, &c". South African Quarterly Journal 1 (5): 9-24. (Lycodon capensis, new species, p. 18). (in Latin and English).

Colubrids
Snakes of Africa
Reptiles described in 1831
Taxa named by Andrew Smith (zoologist)